Tero Pilvi (born 21 February 1976) is a Finnish former footballer who is last known to have played as a midfielder or winger for Cambridge United. After retirement, he became a scientist.

Career

Pili started his career with NuPS. After that, he signed for HIK. After that, he signed for PK-35. After that, he signed for FC Atlantis.

In 2000, Pilvi signed for the Scottish second division side Airdrieonians. In 2001, he signed for Cambridge United in the English third division.

References

External links
 

Finnish footballers
Living people
1976 births
Cambridge United F.C. players
Airdrieonians F.C. (1878) players
Expatriate footballers in Scotland
Veikkausliiga players
Scottish Professional Football League players
English Football League players
Finnish expatriate sportspeople in Scotland
Finnish expatriate footballers
Association football wingers
Association football midfielders
Finnish expatriate sportspeople in England
Expatriate footballers in England